Emanuel Witz (27 June 1717 – 11 December 1797) was a Swiss painter, born in Biel.

Witz was inspired by his brother (a sculptor) to apply himself to drawing. He subsequently received drawing lessons from Robert Huber in Bern. In 1738, he moved to Paris where he continued his education under instructions of the painter Louis Galloche. He made friends with Edmé Bouchardon, François Boucher, Pierre-Jacques Cazes, Charles Joseph Natoire and Charles André van Loo. Afterwards he worked in Spain and Portugal as a portrait painter, historical painter and genre painter. Soon after his arrival, he got into difficulties and returned to Biel in the 1760s.

References

External links
 
 Werke von Emanuel Witz in der Kunstsammlung Biel
 Dictionnaire du Jura - Witz, Emmanuel

18th-century Swiss painters
18th-century Swiss male artists
Swiss male painters
1717 births
1797 deaths
People from Biel/Bienne